General Roberts may refer to:

Abraham Roberts (1784–1873), British East India Company general 
Arthur Roberts (British Army officer) (1870-1917), British Army brigadier general
Benjamin S. Roberts (1810–1875), Union Army brevet major general
Carson Abel Roberts (1905–1983), U.S. Marine Corps lieutenant general
Charles DuVal Roberts (1873–1966), U.S. Army brigadier general
Frank Crowther Roberts (1891–1982), British Army major general
Frederick Roberts, 1st Earl Roberts (1832–1914), British Army general
John Hamilton Roberts (1891–1962), Canadian Army major general
John W. Roberts (1921–1999), U.S. Air Force general
Ouvry Lindfield Roberts (1898–1986), British Army general
Philip Roberts (British Army officer) (1906–1997), British Army major general
Sebastian Roberts (born 1954), British Army major general
William Paul Roberts (1841–1910), Confederate States Army brigadier general

See also
Len Roberts-Smith (born 1946), Australian Defence Force major general
Attorney General Roberts (disambiguation)